Dorte is a 1951 Danish family film directed by Jon Iversen.

Cast
Ilselil Larsen as Dorte
Ib Schønberg as Director Asger Hansen
Preben Neergaard as Steen
Nina Pens Rode as Margot
Johannes Meyer as Prokuristen
Helge Kjærulff-Schmidt as Olsen
Sigurd Langberg as Director Herbert Christoffersen
Ove Sprogøe as Hr. Smith
Maria Garland as Card player at Hansen
Katy Valentin as Birthe Hansen
Henning Moritzen - Doctor Sørensen
Birthe Illum as Steen's friend - Kitty
Else Jarlbak as Fru Sedenius
Christen Møller as Police Commissioner
Henry Nielsen as Porter
Poul Müller as Card player at Hansen
Dirch Passer as American
Ellen Margrethe Stein as Guest at the party
Ego Brønnum-Jacobsen as Dorte's bridgelære
Inge Ketti as Office Lady
Bjørn Puggaard-Müller as Cook's friend
Signi Grenness as Secretary
Sven Gyldmark as Pianist (uncredited)

External links

Danish black-and-white films
Films directed by Jon Iversen
Films scored by Sven Gyldmark
1950s Danish-language films